Lyubomyrivka is a rural settlement (a village) in Bashtanka Raion, Mykolaiv Oblast (province) of Ukraine. It belongs to Bereznehuvate settlement hromada, one of the hromadas of Ukraine. 

Until 18 July 2020, Lyubomyrivka was located in Bereznehuvate Raion. The raion was abolished in July 2020 as part of the administrative reform of Ukraine, which reduced the number of raions of Mykolaiv Oblast to four. The area of Bereznehuvate Raion was merged into Bashtanka Raion.

References 

Villages in Bashtanka Raion